Léonard Mendy (born 22 March 1982 in Évreux) is a professional French football player. He currently plays for FC Rouen.

He played on the professional level in Ligue 2 for Le Havre AC and Clermont Foot.

References

1982 births
Living people
French footballers
French expatriate footballers
Expatriate footballers in England
Ligue 2 players
Le Havre AC players
Crawley Town F.C. players
Clermont Foot players
FC Istres players
FC Gueugnon players
AS Beauvais Oise players
FC Rouen players
Championnat National players
FC Dieppe players

Association football defenders